Trouble In The Jungle is the sixth release by Teenage Head and their fourth full-length studio album. It was issued in 1986 by Warpt Records as catalogue number WR-924 and distributed by ARC Sound Company in Canada. It was available on LP and cassette.  Singer Frankie Venom would leave the band after this album was released but returned in 1989. This was also the last recording to feature original drummer Nick Stipanitz who is listed in the credits as an additional musician.  His replacement Mark Lockerbie is featured in the "Frantic Romantic" video.  "Frantic Romantic" was originally released as a 7" vinyl single by Warpt/Ahed Records in 1985 with non album track "Get Down" on the B Side.  It was reissued in 1986 by Warpt with "I Can't Pretend" on the B Side.  Trouser Press espoused that Teenage Head reclaimed their "sense of fun on the nifty Trouble in the Jungle".

Track listing

Personnel 
Teenage Head
Frankie Venom (Kerr) - vocals
Gordie "Lazy Legs" Lewis - guitar
Dave Rave (DesRoches) - guitar
Steve Marshall (Mahon) - bass

Additional musicians
Nick Stipanitz - drums
Tim Gibbons - harmonica
Ed Roth - DX7 & Oberheim
The Touch - guitar

Production Credits
Produced by Dave DesRoches & Gord Lewis
Recorded at Bob and Dan Lanois' Studio; Hamilton, Ontario, Canada
Engineered by Dave Bottrill

References

External links 
"Teenage Head - Trouble In The Jungle" at Discogs. Retrieved 2 June 2013.
"Trouble In The Jungle By Teenage Head" at RateYourMusic. Retrieved 2 June 2013.

1986 albums
Teenage Head (band) albums